The Outside is a 1917 play by Susan Glaspell.

The Outside may also refer to:

 "The Outside" (Twenty One Pilots song), 2021
 "The Outside", a song by Taylor Swift from the album Taylor Swift, 2006
 The Outside, a 2009 film starring Michael Graziadei

See also
 Outside (disambiguation)
 The Outsider (disambiguation)